Aleksey Golovin (born 6 November 1962) is a Russian bobsledder. He competed at the two-man event at the 1992 Winter Olympics.

References

1962 births
Living people
Russian male bobsledders
Olympic bobsledders of the Unified Team
Bobsledders at the 1992 Winter Olympics
Sportspeople from Oryol